Merck Records (2000–2007) was a record label based in Miami and run by Gabe Koch. It released electronic music.

Background
Their releases cover a wide range of styles, from cut up vocal hip hop by their most prominent artist Machinedrum, to central IDM by artists like Proem, Mr. Projectile, and Deru, to indie-influenced electronic music like Tiki Obmar or Lateduster. They also release a wide geographical range of artists, from all over Europe and the US, as well as Australia, Russia and Japan. Also Merck is somewhat known for only putting forth minimal artist images, and not promoting the label in the traditional music industry push style.

Merck had produced 51 CD releases and 50 vinyl records by February 2007, at which point it ceased releasing new material.

A sublabel, Narita Records, has been set up by Merck to put out more dancefloor-oriented music.

End announcement

Artists

Merck Records
 40 Winks
 Adam Johnson
 Anders Ilar
 Aphilas
 Blamstrain
 Deceptikon
 Deru
 Esem
 Frank & Bill
 Helios
 Ilkae
 Kettel
 Kristuit Salu vs. Morris Nightingale (aka Jimmy Edgar)
 Lackluster
 Landau
 Lateduster
 Machinedrum
 Malcom Kipe
 md
 Mr. Projectile
 Quench
 Proem
 Proswell
 Royal Foxbridge
 Secede
 Semiomime
 Sense
 Syndrone
 Tiki Obmar
 Tim Koch
 Temp Sound Solutions
 Tycho

Narita Records
 Anders Ilar
 Arctic Hospital
 Benjamin May
 Blamstrain
 Brothomstates
 Yard

See also
 List of record labels
 List of electronic music record labels
 Electronica
 Intelligent dance music
 Techno

External links
 official Merck site
 official Narita site
 www.audibleoddities.com

American independent record labels
Electronic music record labels
Hip hop record labels
Record labels established in 2000